Ekeblad is a surname for a noble family from Sweden. Notable people with the surname include:

Eva Ekeblad (1724–1786), Swedish agronomist, scientist, salonist and noble
Russ Ekeblad (1946–2018), American bridge player

Surnames of Swedish origin